Keith Smith may refer to:

Entertainment
Keith Smith (writer) (1917–2011), Australian broadcaster, early screen personality and writer
Keith Smith (actor) (1926–2008), British actor
Keith A. Smith (born 1938), American artist and author
Keith Randolph Smith, American Broadway, television and film actor active since 1986
Keith Smith (guitarist), vocalist and guitarist for the band Anarchy Club
Keith Smith (trumpeter) (1940–2008), British jazz trumpeter

Sports
Keith Smith (Australian footballer) (1914–1997), Australian footballer
Keith Smith (cricketer) (1929–2016), New Zealand cricketer 
Keith Smith (American football coach), head football coach of the Eastern Illinois University Panthers in 1956
Keith Smith (English footballer) (born 1940), English footballer
Keith Smith (rugby) (1952–2006), English rugby player
Keith Smith (outfielder) (born 1953), Major League Baseball outfielder
Keith Smith (shortstop) (born 1961), Major League Baseball infielder for the New York Yankees
Keith Smith (basketball) (born 1964), American basketball player
Keith Smith (cornerback) (born 1980), American football player
Keith Smith (fullback) (born 1992), American football fullback for the Atlanta Falcons
Keith Smith (quarterback) (born 1976), American and Canadian football player
Keith Smith (ice hockey), Canadian ice hockey defenseman

Others
Keith Smith (general) (1928–2012), American Marine Corps general
Keith Macpherson Smith (1890–1955), Australian aviator
Keith Smith (engineer) (1915–2011), Commonwealth Railways commissioner in Australia
Keith Cameron Smith (born 1971), American entrepreneur
Keith Vincent Smith, Australian writer, historian and journalist